Moghestan-e Akbar (also Romanized as Moghestān-e Akbar; also known as Moghestān) is a village in Rabatat Rural District, Kharanaq District, Ardakan County, Yazd Province, Iran. At the 2006 census, its population was 145, in 42 families.

References 

Populated places in Ardakan County